The 1940 United States presidential election in New Hampshire took place on November 5, 1940. All contemporary 48 states were part of the 1940 United States presidential election. State voters chose four electors to the Electoral College, which selected the president and vice president.

New Hampshire was won by incumbent Democratic President Franklin D. Roosevelt of New York, who was running against Republican businessman Wendell Willkie of New York. Roosevelt ran with Henry A. Wallace of Iowa as his running mate, and Willkie ran with Senator Charles L. McNary of Oregon.

Roosevelt won New Hampshire by 6.44%, at the time the best performance by a Democratic presidential candidate in this traditionally Republican state since the latter party was founded and the first time since Franklin Pierce in 1852 that a Democrat won the state with an absolute majority of the vote. (It had been won with a plurality by Roosevelt four years earlier and by Woodrow Wilson in 1912 and 1916.) Roosevelt's gain in New Hampshire and other New England states, in an election when Willkie carried almost seven hundred counties that the President had won during his landslide four years beforehand, was due to support in the region for helping Britain and France during World War II.

Results

Results by county

See also
 United States presidential elections in New Hampshire

References

New Hampshire
1940
1940 New Hampshire elections